The 2020–21 Czech Extraliga season was the 28th season of the Czech Extraliga since its creation after the breakup of Czechoslovakia and the Czechoslovak First Ice Hockey League in 1993.

Regular season

Standings
Each team played 52 games, playing each of the other thirteen teams four times. Points were awarded for each game, where three points were awarded for winning in regulation time, two points for winning in overtime or shootout, one point for losing in overtime or shootout, and zero points for losing in regulation time. At the end of the regular season, the team that finished with the most points was crowned the league champion.

Playoffs
Twelve teams qualify for the playoffs: the top four teams in the regular season have a bye to the quarterfinals, while teams ranked fifth to twelfth meet each other (5 versus 12, 6 versus 11, 7 versus 10, 8 versus 9) in a preliminary playoff round.

Bracket

Wild card round

Quarterfinals

Semifinals

Finals

Třinec wins the finals 4–1.

Final rankings

References

External links
Official website

Czech Extraliga seasons
Czech
2020–21 in Czech ice hockey leagues